Stickles is the surname of:

Edward Stickles (born 1942), American former swimmer and swimming coach
Monty Stickles (1938-2006), American National Football League player 
Terri Stickles (born 1946), American former swimmer
Patrick Stickles (born 1985), American punk rock musician